Movement of New Forces (Rukh Novykh Syl) is a Ukrainian political party that was founded as the "Party of Harmonious Development" on February 11, 2015 and renamed in February 2017 by Mikheil Saakashvili.

History
After autumn 2015 attempts and negotiations were launched to form a political party around then Governor of Odessa Oblast Mikheil Saakashvili and members of the parliamentary group Interfactional Union "Eurooptimists", Democratic Alliance and possibly Self Reliance. This project collapsed in June 2016.

On 11 November 2016, Saakashvili announced the establishment of a new Ukrainian political party. This was done four days after he resigned as Governor of Odessa Oblast, blaming President Petro Poroshenko personally for enabling corruption in Odessa and in Ukraine overall. On 27 November 2016 this party (now named Movement of New Forces) held its first rally in Kyiv. In August of that same year Saakashvili was allegedly in talks to create another liberal party with ex-deputy general prosecutors Vitaly Kasko, David Sakvarelidze, MP , and others. In July 2016, Chumak stated that a future party called Wave would be led by Saakashvili.

In late February 2017, the Ministry of Justice of Ukraine registered Movement of New Forces officially as a political party. On 24 December 2016, Saakashvili claimed that the new party had "already registered 25,000 members."

In April 2017, the party Volia and Movement of New Forces announced they would merge. At the same time, according to Saakashvili, nine Ukrainian mayors joined this new association.

In July 2017, the Movement of New Forces and the political movement Spravedlivost of Valentyn Nalyvaichenko created a "joint action headquarters".

On 26 July 2017, President Poroshenko issued a decree stripping party leader Saakashvili of his Ukrainian citizenship. In Ukraine only Ukrainian citizens can lead political parties or be elected to its parliament. David Sakvarelidze became the acting party leader.

In October 2017, the Committee of Voters of Ukraine prepared an appeal to the National Agency for the Prevention of Corruption with a request to check the activities of 21 parties including the Movement of New Forces and Our Ukraine because of the presence of signs of shadow financing. The reason for initiating the verification of the 
Movement of New Forces was the lack of reporting on the Agency's website for the second quarter of 2017.

On 5 December 2017, Prosecutor General Yuriy Lutsenko stated that Saakashvili had received half a million dollars from Ukrainian oligarch Serhiy Kurchenko for organizing protests. It was stated that Kurchenko provided funds to seize Saakashvili's power in Ukraine and expected that in return criminal cases would be closed and control over his assets restored. Records of Saakashvili allegedly talking to Sergei Kurchenko have been released. Saakashvili denied the allegations. Three criminal proceedings were registered on the facts of the protests of December 17.

After Saakashvili (after being first deported to Poland) relocated to the Netherlands in February 2018 he only has an advisory role in the party.

In December 2018 the party Volia reversed its decision to merge with the party. Volia party leader  (and member of the Ukrainian parliament) Yury Derevyanko stated Volia would not merge because Movement of New Forces leader Saakashvili was more interested in his native Georgia than in Ukrainian politics. Derevyanko also claimed that 90% of local council members of Movement of New  Forces had joined Volia.

On 29 May 2019 Saakashvili returned to Ukraine after President Volodymyr Zelensky returned his Ukrainian citizenship; but 
Saakashvili soon stated that he had no political ambitions  in Ukraine.

The party in June 2019 stated it intended to run in the late July 2019 Ukrainian parliamentary election. On 23 June 2019 the Central Election Commission of Ukraine refused party members to register for the July parliamentary election because  allegedly the 10 June party congress had violated the party’s statute. Two days later the Administrative Court of Kyiv overturned this Central Election Commission decision. On 19 July 2019, the leader of the Movement of New Forces party Mikheil Saakashvili called on his supporters to vote for the Servant of the People party at the 2019 parliamentary election. At these elections, Saakashvili himself was first on its party list, Movement of New Forces failed to win any parliamentary seats gaining 0.46% of the total votes while the election had a 5% election threshold (43.16% voted for Servant of the People). The party also failed to win a constituency seat. It had participated in 9 constituencies where its most successful candidate's election result was 2.54%, the second best candidate gained 1.8%. Viola also did not win any parliamentary seats in the election.

In the 2020 Ukrainian local elections 1 person won a local seat on behalf of the party.

Management 

The party's Political Council includes Mikheil Saakashvili, Yuri Derevyanko, David Sakvarelidze and Olga Galabala.

Political positions
In April 2017 party leader Saakashvili proposed "building of a large wall" to "temporarily isolate ourselves" from the separatist Donetsk People's Republic and Luhansk People's Republic in order to "concentrate on the rest of Ukraine." Saakashvili is confident in the return under control of the Ukrainian Government of these separatist territories, but only "after we defeat corruption and begin rapid development."

Early June 2019 party leaders Sakvarelidze and Saakashvili stated that the party wanted "to support the new wave brought by the team of (recently elected) Ukrainian president Volodymyr Zelensky".

Notes

References

External links
 

2017 establishments in Ukraine
Liberal parties in Ukraine
Political parties established in 2017
Pro-European political parties in Ukraine